Cousiniopsis is a genus of flowering plants in the family Asteraceae.

There is only one known species, Cousiniopsis atractyloides, which is native to central Asia (Kazakhstan, Uzbekistan, Tajikistan, Kyrgyzstan, Afghanistan, Iran, and Turkmenistan).

References

Monotypic Asteraceae genera
Flora of Asia
Cynareae